Scott R. Kurtz (born March 15, 1971) is an American webcomic artist. Known for creating the daily online comic-strip PvP, Kurtz is among the first professional webcomic creators.

Career
Kurtz was born to a Catholic household in Watsonville, California. He attended the University of North Texas where he created and published a daily comic strip Captain Amazing in the North Texas Daily, the student newspaper. It ran for four semesters. His first work on the internet were comics related to the MMORPG game Ultima Online called "Samwise" and later "Tales by Tavernlight." Scott also produced a comic about his life as a newlywed called "Wedlock" for the early subscription comics site Modern Tales. Kurtz also co-wrote the comic Truth, Justin and the American way with Aaron Williams.

He launched PvP May 4, 1998, for a gaming website (MPOG.COM). In June 1999, Kurtz retooled the strip and re-launched it. In March 2000, he launched a print version as a bi-monthly for Dork Storm Press. After publishing the print version of PvP for eight years through Image Comics, he began self-publishing, citing a natural readership decline of the print version and an increase of the online version. His self-publishing company, Toonhound Studios LLC, is a Texas entity with operations in Seattle.

Kurtz created a spin-off webcomic of PvP in 2013, entitled Table Titans. He also co-wrote The Trenches with Jerry Holkins and Mike Krahulik. The Trenches was a comic about working in the video game industry which ran from 2011 to 2016.

Kurtz played the character Dwarven Fighter Binwin Bronzebottom in Acquisitions Incorporated, a Dungeons & Dragons-related podcast and live show. In 2013, Kurtz collaborated with Kris Straub to write and produce an animated series for ShiftyLook based on the video game Mappy, titled Mappy: The Beat, with Kurtz also voicing several characters.

Kurtz lived in Little Elm, Texas until his move to Seattle in 2010, where he worked from the Penny Arcade offices for over a year. He now works from home.

Nominations & awards 

 2005: Nominated, Eisner Award, Best Writer/Artist—Humor — Image Comics, PvP
2005: Eagle Award, Favourite Web-based Comic - PvP
 2006: Eisner Award, Best Digital Comic — PvP
 2010: Harvey Award, Best Online Comic Work — PvP

Selected publications 
 How to Make Web Comics, by Brad J. Guigar, Dave Kellett, Scott Kurtz, Kris Straub, Image Comics (2008)

See also 
 PvP
 Table Titans

References

External links 

PvP
 The Trenches

1971 births
Living people
American comic strip cartoonists
American comics artists
American comics writers
American webcomic creators
Alternative cartoonists
People from Kenmore, Washington
Artists from Seattle